Dušići, formerly Dečići(Deçiq),  is a village in the municipality of Tuzi, Montenegro. It became well known during the Albanian Revolt of 1911 with the Battle of Deçiq. R. Elsie puts the location around 3 km southwest of Tuzi. Right across the border with Albania, there is Koplik, the largest town in the Albanian region of Malësia.

Demographics
According to the 2011 census, its population was 188.

References

Populated places in Tuzi Municipality
Albanian communities in Montenegro